Põhja-Pärnumaa Parish is a rural municipality in Pärnu County.

Settlements
Boroughs
Pärnu-Jaagupi, Tootsi, Vändra

Villages
There are 86 villages: Aasa, Allikõnnu, Altküla, Aluste, Anelema, Arase, Eametsa, Eense
, Eerma, Enge, Ertsma
, Halinga, Helenurme, Kaansoo, Kablima
, Kadjaste, Kaelase, Kaisma, Kalmaru, Kangru
, Kergu, Kirikumõisa
, Kobra
, Kodesmaa, Kõnnu
, Kose
, Kullimaa
, Kuninga
, Kurgja, Langerma
, Leetva, Lehtmetsa
, Lehu, Libatse, Loomse, Luuri, Lüüste, Mädara, Mäeküla, Maima, Massu, Metsavere, Metsaküla
, Mõisaküla, Mustaru, Naartse, Oese, Oriküla, Pallika
, Pärnjõe, Pereküla, Pitsalu, Pööravere
, Rae, Rahkama, Rahnoja
, Rätsepa, Reinumurru, Roodi
, Rõusa, Rukkiküla, Säästla, Salu
, Samliku, Sepaküla
, Sikana, Sohlu, Sõõrike, Soosalu
, Suurejõe, Tagassaare, Tarva, Tõrdu, Tühjasma, Ünnaste, Vahenurme, Vakalepa, Vaki
, Valistre, Vee, Venekuusiku, Veskisoo, Vihtra
, Viluvere, Võidula, Võiera

Religion

References